Robinson Township is one of ten townships in Posey County, Indiana. As of the 2000 census, its population was 3,976.

Robinson Township was named at an unknown date for Jonathan Robinson, an early settler.

Unincorporated places
Blairsville
Lippe
Parkers Settlement
St. Wendel

References

External links
 Indiana Township Association
 United Township Association of Indiana

Townships in Posey County, Indiana
Townships in Indiana